Oudenodon is an extinct genus of dicynodont. It was common throughout southern Africa during the Late Permian. Several species of Oudenodon are known. Both O. bainii, the type species, and O. grandis are known from South Africa. Specimens of O. luangwensis have been found from Zambia. One species, O. sakamenensis, is the only Permian therapsid yet known from Madagascar. It is the type genus of the family Oudenodontidae, which includes members such as Tropidostoma.

See also

 List of therapsids

References

 The main groups of non-mammalian synapsids at Mikko's Phylogeny Archive

External links

Oudenodon in the Paleobiology Database

Lopingian synapsids of Africa
Dicynodonts
Fossil taxa described in 1860
Lopingian genus first appearances
Lopingian genus extinctions
Anomodont genera